Pleasant Valley  (Scottish Gaelic: An Gleann) is a community in the Canadian province of Nova Scotia, located in  Antigonish County .

References
Pleasant Valley on Destination Nova Scotia

Communities in Antigonish County, Nova Scotia
General Service Areas in Nova Scotia